Umar Faruq Abd-Allah (born Wymann-Landgraf; born 1948) is an American Islamic theologian, author, spiritual guide, and educator.

Biography
Umar Faruq Abd-Allah was born in 1948 in Columbus, Nebraska to a Protestant family. He was raised in Athens, Georgia, where both of his parents worked as tutors at the University of Georgia. He received his PhD on the origins of Islamic law from the University of Chicago. Abd-Allah began his career as a teacher of Arabic and Islamic Studies and taught at different institutions in the United States and Canada. He left America in 1982 to teach Arabic in Spain. Two years later, he was appointed to King Abdul-Aziz University's Department of Islamic Studies in Jeddah, where he conducted courses on Islamic studies and comparative religion for many years. He studied under numerous traditional scholars during his stay in Jeddah. In 2000, he returned to the United States to serve the Nawawi Foundation in Chicago, where he had spent over a decade. From 2002 to 2013, he taught Islamic Studies at Darul Qasim Institute in Chicago. He has been considered to fall into the Islamic Neo-Traditionalist movement.

Works

 A Muslim in Victorian America: The Life of Alexander Russell Webb (2006)
 Mālik and Medina: Islamic Legal Reasoning in the Formative Period (2013) 
 The Islamic struggle in Syria (1983)
 Islam and the Cultural Imperative (2004)

See also
 Hamza Yusuf

References 

20th-century Muslim theologians
American religion academics
American Islamic studies scholars
American non-fiction writers
21st-century Muslim theologians
Living people
1948 births
Muslim scholars of Islamic studies